Alan William Raitt,  (21 September 1930 – 2 September 2006) was a British scholar of French literature, specialising in nineteenth-century French literature. From 1992 to 1997, he was Professor of French Literature at the University of Oxford.

Early life and education
Raitt was born on 21 September 1930 in Morpeth, Northumberland, England. He was educated at The King Edward VI School, Morpeth, then an all-boys state grammar school. He studied Modern Languages (French and German) at Magdalen College, Oxford, graduating with a first class Bachelor of Arts (BA) degree in 1951. His undergraduate tutor had been Austin Gill. He remained at Magdalen College to undertake postgraduate research on "Villiers de l'Isle-Adam and the Symbolist movement", completing his Doctor of Philosophy (DPhil) degree in 1957.

Academic career
From 1953 to 1955, Raitt was a Fellow (by examination) of Magdalen College, Oxford. From 1955 to 1966, he was Fellow of Exeter College, Oxford. In 1966, he returned to Magdalen College where he had been elected a fellow, and would remain there until his retirement in 1997; that year he was elected Fellow Emeritus. He also held a number of positions at university level in the University of Oxford: he was a Special Lecturer in French Literature from 1976 to 1979, Reader from French Literature from 1979 to 1992, and Professor of French Literature from 1992 to 1997.

Raitt also held a number of appointments outside of Oxford. He was visiting lecturer at the University of Georgia in 1986. He was Visiting Professor at the Paris-Sorbonne University from 1987 to 1988. From 1987 to 1997, he was General Editor of French Studies, the journal of the Society for French Studies.

Personal life

In 1959, Raitt married Janet Taylor. Together, they had two daughters. They divorced in 1971. In 1974, he married Lia Noémia Rodrigues Correia; she outlived him.

Honours
In 1971, Raitt was a Fellow of the Royal Society of Literature (FRSL). In 1992, he was elected a Fellow of the British Academy (FBA), the UK's national academy for the humanities and the social sciences. In 1995, he was appointed a Commandeur de l'Ordre des Palmes Académiques (Commander of the Order of Academic Palms) by the French government.

Selected works

References

External links
 "Alan Raitt" (Fellows Remembered), The Royal Society of Literature

1930 births
2006 deaths
Historians of French literature
British literary historians
Academics of the University of Oxford
Fellows of the British Academy
Fellows of the Royal Society of Literature
Fellows of Magdalen College, Oxford
Fellows of Exeter College, Oxford
Commandeurs of the Ordre des Palmes Académiques
Alumni of Magdalen College, Oxford